The 2006–07 Israeli Noar Leumit League was the 13th season since its introduction in 1994 as the top-tier football in Israel for teenagers between the ages 18–20.

Beitar Jerusalem won the title, whilst Hapoel Petah Tikva and Maccabi Herzliya were relegated. The relegated teams were replaced by Ironi Kiryat Shmona (promoted from Artzit North Division) and Hapoel Ashkelon (promoted from Artzit South Division).

Final table

References

External links
 2006-2007 Noar Leumit League IFA 
Noar Premier League 06-07 One.co.il 

Israeli Noar Premier League seasons
Youth